Thomas or Tom Donahue may refer to:

 Thomas R. Donahue (1928-2023), American trade union leader
 Thomas Michael Donahue (1921–2004), American physicist, astronomer, and space and planetary scientist
 Tom Donahue (DJ) (1928–1975), pioneering American rock and roll radio disc jockey
 Tom Donahue (filmmaker) (born 1968), American film director and producer

See also 
 Tom Donahoe (fl. 1990s–2010s), American football executive
 Thomas J. Donohue (born 1938), former president of the U.S. Chamber of Commerce
 Tom Donohue (born 1952), American professional baseball player
 Tom Donoghue (born 1951), Irish hurler